Royal George Finch (August 17, 1884 in Eagle Bridge, Rensselaer County, New York – March 4, 1959 in Albany, New York) was an American civil engineer and politician from New York. He was the last New York State Engineer and Surveyor, in office from 1925 to 1926. He was a member of the New York State licensing board for engineers.

Life
He was born on August 17, 1884, in Eagle Bridge, New York to George Nelson Finch and Helen (Hunt) Finch.

He attended the public schools of Granville, New York and later on graduated from the Rensselaer Polytechnic Institute.

On October 19, 1909, he married Jessie Lewis Weller. He had one daughter, Mary Lewis Finch, born June 9, 1912, in Albany, New York

In 1919 he was chief clerk of the New York State Engineer and Surveyor office and was appointed deputy state engineer to replace William B. Landreth.

In 1922 he went to work for Norton Stone and Lime in Cobleskill, New York.

He was State Engineer and Surveyor from 1925 to 1926, elected on the Republican ticket in 1924.  In 1925, he published The Story of the New York State Canals: Historical and Commercial Information. By 1926 he was a member of the New York State Water Power Commission.

In 1926, Democratic Governor Al Smith undertook a major re-organisation of the State administration and the Engineer and Surveyor's Department was abolished, and the duties taken over by the New York State Department of Public Works.

In 1929 he was awarded the Arthur M. Wellington prize for his pamphlet on the Story of the New York State Barge Canal and Its Operation.

On April 30, 1930, he was appointed to the Interoceanic Canal Board.

He died on March 4, 1959, in Albany, New York.

Sources

1884 births
1959 deaths
New York State Engineers and Surveyors
Politicians from Albany, New York
American civil engineers
People from Hoosick, New York
Rensselaer Polytechnic Institute alumni
People from Granville, New York
People from Rensselaer County, New York
New York (state) Republicans